Epimecis scolopaiae is a species of moth in the family Geometridae, subfamily Ennominae. It was first described by Dru Drury in 1773 from Jamaica.

Description
Upper side: antennae filiform. Thorax, abdomen, and wings brownish grey; the latter varied with dark indented brown streaks and lines, contrasted with white and ash colour, crossing them from the anterior to the posterior and abdominal edges.

Under side: legs, sides, abdomen, and wings yellow wainscot-coloured. About half the anterior ones, from the tips towards the shoulders, are marked with faint dark brown lines and streaks. Posterior wings having a faintish dark brown cloud, situated near the upper corners. All the wings are deeply dentated. Wing-span nearly 3½ inches (87 mm).

Subspecies
Epimecis scolopaiae scolopaiae
Epimecis scolopaiae transitaria (Walker, 1860)

References

Boarmiini
Moths described in 1773
Descriptions from Illustrations of Exotic Entomology
Taxa named by Dru Drury